Mikhail Pavlovich Butusov (18 June 1900 in Saint Petersburg – 11 April 1963 in Leningrad) was a Soviet football player and coach and a bandy player. He was the brother of Vasily Butusov.

Honours
 RSFSR Champion: 1924, 1932.
 Leningrad Champion: 1928, 1929, 1931, 1933, 1935.
 Soviet Bandy League bronze: 1936 (with Dynamo Leningrad).

International career
Butusov made his debut for USSR on 16 November 1924 in a friendly against Turkey. He was the captain of the team and scored 2 goals in a 3:0 victory. This was the first official game of the Soviet Union in international football, and therefore Butusov scored the first ever goal for the USSR.

References

External links
 Profile 

Soviet footballers
Soviet Union international footballers
Soviet football managers
FC Dynamo Saint Petersburg players
FC Dynamo Saint Petersburg managers
FC Dinamo Tbilisi managers
FC Zenit Saint Petersburg managers
FC Dynamo Kyiv managers
Soviet bandy players
1900 births
1963 deaths
Association football forwards